Freer High School is a public high school located in the city of Freer, Texas, USA and classified as a 2A school by the UIL.  It is a part of the Freer Independent School District located in northwestern Duval County.   In 2015, the school was rated "Met Standard" by the Texas Education Agency.

Athletics
The Freer Buckaroos compete in these sports - 

Volleyball, Football, Basketball, Powerlifting, Track, Baseball & Softball

State titles
Baseball 
1990(3A)
Volleyball 
1993(2A)

Notable alumni
Jim Acker (Class of 1976) professional baseball player.
Steve McMichael (Class of 1976) professional football player for NFL Chicago Bears.

References

External links
Freer ISD website

Public high schools in Texas
Education in Duval County, Texas